SPINE is a free, open source content management system for publishing content on the World Wide Web and intranets.
The system includes features like easy Web-based administration, full template support to separate style from content, common components like navigation bars, macros, message boards, and page statistics, and the ability to mix static and dynamic content transparently. SPINE is licensed under the GPL, and is written in the Perl programming language and can use the MySQL or PostgreSQL database.

History

Features

SPINE is a feature rich CMS that does not require detailed technical skills to use. Some of SPINE's most significant features are listed below:

 Easy to use Web-based administration: administer your site through web forms.
 Full template support: separate style from content
 Integrate components into your pages: navigation bars, macros, message boards, page statistics and more.
 Full template support: easily switch between available styles or add custom styles.
 Supports Apache 1.3x and Apache 2.x (mod_perl v1 and v2) for fast page loading and administration.
 Mix static and dynamic content transparently.
 Unix style access control restrictions: permit access to pages based on usernames and usergroups.
 Usergroup-based administrative permissions: restrict access to administrative panels based on usergroups.
 Minimal requirements: very few extra packages required.
 File manager: create folders and Copy, upload and rename files in a chrooted environment.
 Extensive API: developers can add both normal plugins and administration plugins.
 Integrate with Apache configuration and additional mod_perl handlers.
 Uses a database for storage with support for MySQL and PostgreSQL.
 Short and search engine friendly URLs: documents are visible are regular files.
 No data files: load database, copy images files, copy Apache configuration and start using.
 Single installation per Web server.
 Simultaneous unique setups.
 Native access logging with advanced details: browser, IP and more.
 Manage any media type: generate HTML, XML, and CSS.
 Short learning process and no programming required. 
 Search engine plugin.

Free content management systems